Pieter "Peter" Windt (born 3 May 1973 in Veendam) is a former Dutch field hockey player, who played 69 international matches for the Netherlands, in which he didn't score a single goal. The defender and midfielder made his debut for the Dutch on 21 January 1997 in a match against Argentina. He was a member of the team that won the gold medal at the 2000 Summer Olympics in Sydney.

External links

 Dutch Hockey Federation

1973 births
Field hockey players at the 2000 Summer Olympics
Dutch male field hockey players
Living people
Olympic field hockey players of the Netherlands
Olympic gold medalists for the Netherlands
People from Veendam
Olympic medalists in field hockey

Medalists at the 2000 Summer Olympics
Sportspeople from Groningen (province)